Fax art is art specifically designed to be sent or transmitted by a facsimile machine, where the "fax art" is the received "fax".  It is also called telecommunications art or telematic art. According to art historians Annmarie Chandler and Norie Neumark, "Fax art was another means of mediating distances",

Fax art was first transmitted in 1980, but that was not documented until 1985. On January 12, 1985, Joseph Beuys together with Andy Warhol and the Japanese artist Kaii Higashiyama participated in the "Global-Art-Fusion" project, a fax art project initiated by the conceptual artist Ueli Fuchser, in which a fax was sent with drawings of all three artists within 32 minutes around the world – from Düsseldorf (Germany) via New York (US) to Tokyo (Japan), received at Vienna's Palais Liechtenstein Museum of Modern Art. This fax was a statement of peace during the Cold War in the 1980s. The earliest scholarly note of fax art in art history was in 1990 by Karen O'Rourke.

See also
 ASCII art
 Computer art
 Digital art
 Email art
 Interactive art
 Internet art
 New media art
 Systems art
 Telematic art
 Faxlore

References
Notes

Bibliography
 Tapani Aartomaa, Kari Piippo, Taideteollinen korkeakoulu. Graafisen suunnittelun laitos, Fax art: just now (Canon, 1992) .  See Google Books
 Urbons Klaus, Elektrografie - Analoge und digitale Bilder, (Köln (DE), DuMont Buchverlag, 1994)
 Andrej Tišma, International Fax Art Project (VLV Gallery, 1995) See Google Books

External links 
 Digital art exchange
 KKArt website

Visual arts media
Fax
Digital art